The Troubles were a period of conflict in Northern Ireland involving republican and loyalist paramilitaries, the British security forces, and civil rights groups. They are usually dated from the late 1960s through to the Good Friday Agreement of 1998. However, sporadic violence continued after this point. Those that continued violence past this point are referred to as "dissident republicans and loyalists". The Troubles, internationally known as the Northern Ireland conflict, claimed roughly 3500 lives.

Prior to 1960
Since partition, the IRA had started a number of terrorist operations in Northern Ireland designed at bringing about their goal of a United Ireland. The intensity of this activity increased towards the end of 1941, where the IRA decided to step up its campaign of attacks in Northern Ireland. In response to this activity the Unionist authorities under John Miller Andrews introduced internment and using provisions of the Emergency Powers Act, instituted increasingly restrictive policies in Northern Ireland. This pattern of paramilitary violence, followed by increasingly restrictive measures on the behalf of the authorities came to define the run-up to the Troubles.

1960–1969
Since 1964, civil rights activists had been protesting against the discrimination against Catholics and Irish nationalists by the Ulster Protestant and unionist government of Northern Ireland. The civil rights movement called for: 'one man, one vote'; the end to gerrymandered electoral boundaries; the end to discrimination in employment and in the allocation of public housing; repeal of the Special Powers Act; and the disbanding of the Ulster Special Constabulary.

1966

1968

1969–1970

1969

1970–1979

1970

1971

1972

January–June

July–December

1973

1974

1975

1976

1977

1978

1979

1980–1989

1980

1981

1982

1983

1984

1985

1986

1987

1988

1989

1990–1999

1990

1991

1992

1993

1994

1995

1996

1997

1998

Post-Troubles incidents (1999–present)

1999

2000–2007

2000

2001

2002

2005

2006

2007

See also
Outline of the Troubles
Northern Ireland peace process
List of bombings during the Northern Ireland Troubles
List of books about The Troubles
Timeline of Provisional Irish Republican Army actions
Timeline of Irish National Liberation Army actions
Timeline of Continuity Irish Republican Army actions
Timeline of Real Irish Republican Army actions
Timeline of Ulster Volunteer Force actions
Timeline of Ulster Defence Association actions
Timeline of Loyalist Volunteer Force actions
Timeline of Orange Volunteers actions
List of Irish police officers killed in the line of duty
Operation Banner

References

External links
 
 CAIN project

 
20th century in Northern Ireland
The Troubles
The Troubles